Azonexus caeni is a species of nitrogen-fixing bacteria. It is a root bacteria and together with Azonexus fungiphilus and Azonexus hydrophilus is one of the three species in the genus. It is Gram-negative, motile, non-spore-forming and slightly curved rod-shaped. Slu-05T (=DSM 17719T=KCTC 12530T=CCBAU 10199T) is the type strain.

References

Further reading
Whitman, William B., et al., eds. Bergey's manual® of systematic bacteriology. Vol. 2. Springer, 2012.

External links

Type strain of Azonexus caeni at BacDive -  the Bacterial Diversity Metadatabase

Rhodocyclaceae
Bacteria described in 2006